Lyndall Gordon (born 4 November 1941) is a British-based biographical and former academic writer, known for her literary biographies. She is a senior research fellow at St Hilda's College, Oxford.

Life
Born in Cape Town, she had her undergraduate studies at the University of Cape Town and her doctorate at Columbia University in New York City. She is married to pathologist, Siamon Gordon; they have two daughters.

Gordon is the author of Eliot's Early Years (1977), which won the British Academy's Rose Mary Crawshay Prize; Virginia Woolf: A Writer's Life (1984), which won the James Tait Black Memorial Prize; Charlotte Brontë: A Passionate Life (1994), winner of the Cheltenham Prize for Literature; and Vindication: A Life of Mary Wollstonecraft, shortlisted for the BBC Four Samuel Johnson Prize. Her most recent publications are Lives Like Loaded Guns: Emily Dickinson and her Family's Feuds (2010), which has challenged the established assumptions about the poet's life; Shared Lives: Growing Up in 50s Cape Town (D. Philip Publishers, 1992); Divided Lives: Dreams of a Mother and a Daughter (London: Virago, 2014); and Outsiders: Five Women Writers Who Changed the World (London: Virago, 2017).

Gordon’s most recent work is The Hyacinth Girl: T.S. Eliot’s Hidden Muse (2023).

Works
Eliot's Early Years. Oxford University Press, 1977. 
; W. W. Norton & Company, 2001, 
Eliot's New Life. Oxford University Press, 1988
Shared Lives. Norton, 1992. 
Charlotte Brontë: A Passionate Life Chatto & Windus, 1994. ; Little, Brown Book Group, 2009. 
A Private Life of Henry James: Two Women and His Art. Chatto & Windus, 1998. . Also titled Henry James: His Women and His Art. Virago, 2012, 

 2006. 

Divided Lives: Dreams of a Mother and a Daughter. London: Virago, 2014.
Outsiders: Five Women Writers Who Changed the World. London: Virago, 2017.
"Dreams of a Mother and Daughter," in Dale Salwak, ed. Writers and Their Mothers. Palgrave Macmillan, 2018. 
The Hyacinth Girl: T.S. Eliot’s Hidden Muse. London: 2022.

Notes

External links
 Lyndall Gordon's official site

Living people
South African biographers
Women biographers
English biographers
University of Cape Town alumni
Fellows of the Royal Society of Literature
Writers from Cape Town
Columbia University alumni
James Tait Black Memorial Prize recipients
1941 births
20th-century South African women writers
20th-century biographers
21st-century South African women writers
21st-century biographers
Mary Wollstonecraft scholars